Mitchel Resnick (born June 12, 1956) is LEGO Papert Professor of Learning Research, Director of the Okawa Center, and Director of the Lifelong Kindergarten group at the Massachusetts Institute of Technology (MIT) Media Lab. , Resnick serves as head of the Media Arts and Sciences academic program, which grants master's degrees and Ph.D.s at the MIT Media Lab.

Resnick's research group has developed a variety of educational tools that engage people in new types of design activities and learning experiences, including the Programmable Bricks that were the basis for the award-winning Lego Mindstorms and StarLogo software. He cofounded the Computer Clubhouse, an award-winning network of learning centers for youth from under-served communities. Resnick is also a cofounder and a co-principal investigator of the Center for Civic Media at MIT. Resnick's group has developed a new computer programming language, named Scratch, that makes it easier for children to create animated stories, video games, and interactive art. Resnick is also involved in the next generation of Programmable Bricks, and the One Laptop per Child project which designed the OLPC XO ($100 laptop).

Education
Resnick, a graduate of Haverford High School, earned a B.A. in physics at Princeton University (1978), and M.S. and Ph.D. degrees in computer science at MIT (1988, 1992).

Career
He worked for five years as a science–technology journalist for Business Week magazine, and he has consulted widely on the uses of computers in education. Resnick was awarded a National Science Foundation Young Investigator Award in 1993. He has collaborated extensively with researchers such as Natalie Rusk, Brian Silverman, and Yasmin Kafai.

Awards
Resnick is a winner of the 2011 Harold W. McGraw, Jr. Prize in Education. He has been listed as one of the 100 most creative people in Business 2011 by Fast Company.

Published books

See also
 Timeline of programming languages
 Scratch (programming language)

References

External links

 

Princeton University alumni
MIT School of Engineering alumni
Massachusetts Institute of Technology faculty
Living people
1956 births
MIT Media Lab people